Tomopleura cicatrigula is a species of sea snail, a marine gastropod mollusk in the family Borsoniidae.

Description
The size of the shell attains 15 mm.

Distribution
This marine species is endemic to Australia and occurs off the Northern Territory, Queensland and Western Australia.

References

  Hedley, C. 1922. A revision of the Australian Turridae. Records of the Australian Museum 13(6): 213–359, pls 42–56
 Wilson, B. 1994. Australian Marine Shells. Prosobranch Gastropods. Kallaroo, WA : Odyssey Publishing Vol. 2 370 pp.

External links
 
 C.K. Chang (1999), Part 9 Borsoniinae & Mitromorphiinae Species

cicatrigula
Gastropods described in 1922